Wheathill is a civil parish in Shropshire, England.  It contains 14 listed buildings that are recorded in the National Heritage List for England.  Of these, three are listed at Grade II*, the middle of the three grades, and the others are at Grade II, the lowest grade.  The parish contains the villages of Wheathill, Loughton, and Silvington, and is otherwise rural.  Almost all the listed buildings are in the villages, and consist of churches, houses, farmhouses, farm buildings, and a sundial, the one listed building outside the villages being a milepost.


Key

Buildings

References

Citations

Sources

Lists of buildings and structures in Shropshire